Centum City is a major multi-project urban development part of Haeundae-gu, Busan, South Korea. It is also one of CBDs in Busan Metropolitan City. This site is at the westernmost area of Haeundae-gu in U-1-dong, Jae-song-dong. The site was originally the place of Suyeong Airport, the former airport of Busan. Centum City can be accessed by  Busan Metro Line 2 at Centum City Station.

Purpose 
Main purpose to make Centum City of Busan is three:
 Promoting the industrial structure in Busan industrial areas.
 Attracting the central management function in response to the globalization and information age in the 21st century.
 Implementing projects to create information complexes reflected in Busan and Gyeong-nam development projects.

Area 
 Phase 1 : 1,163,943.1  m2 (completed)
 Phase 2 : 14,100.1  m2 (completed)

Period 
 Sep. 1997 ～  Feb. 28. 2006 (Phase 1)
 Sep. 1997 ～  Jun. 13. 2007 (Phase 2)

See also
 Shinsegae Centum City (the world's largest department store)
 Busan Cinema Center (the BIFF's headquarters)
 Korea New Network (the biggest free-to-air regional broadcaster in South Korea)

References

Haeundae District
Planned cities in South Korea